Flower's Cove is a town in the Canadian province of Newfoundland and Labrador. The town had a population of 272 in the Canada 2021 Census. It is known for its thrombolite fossils.

Geography 
Climate
Flower's Cove has a subarctic climate (Koppen: Dfc) per usual of the Great Northern Peninsula. Summers are short, cool and rainy, while winters are long, very cold, and snowy, with annual snowfall averaging 109 inches (277 cm). Summer typically begins by late June and can last until the end of September. Autumn is short but cool, with highs in the mid-40s (°F) and lows in the mid-30s (°F). Winter usually begins during November, sometimes late October, and can last into May. Springs are cool and relatively dry, and typically start during May and end during June, where summer begins.

Demographics 

Sights
Flower's Cove is famous for thrombolites, very rare fossils which can be seen on the coast in the southern part of the town, remnants of  bacteria and algae. They are about 650 million years old. The only places where thrombolites were found are Flower's Cove and Western Australia.

There are three churches in Flower's Cove, the most famous and largest of which is St. Barnabas Anglican Church. It is known as Skin Boot Church, as leather shoes were sold for the church fund when the church was built in the 1920s. Flower's Cove United Church is the smallest. It has a flèche instead of a spire.

Marjorie Bridge is a red-roofed bridge dating from the beginning of the 20th century. It is close to the Roman Catholic Church Lady of Snow, which is more than 100 years old. The church was renovated in 2007. It is a part of Our Lady of Grace Parish in Bird Cove, which belongs to the diocese of St. George.

Gallery

See also
List of lighthouses in Canada
 List of cities and towns in Newfoundland and Labrador

References

External links

 Aids to Navigation Canadian Coast Guard

Towns in Newfoundland and Labrador
Lighthouses in Newfoundland and Labrador